The Weisz–Prater criterion is a method used to estimate the influence of pore diffusion on reaction rates in heterogeneous catalytic reactions. If the criterion is satisfied, pore diffusion limitations are negligible. The criterion is 

Diffusion is usually in the Knudsen regime when average pore radius is less than 100 nm.
For a given effectiveness factor,, and reaction order, n, the quantity  is defined by the equation:

for small values of beta this can be approximated using the binomial theorem:

Assuming  with a reaction order  gives value of  equal to 0.1. Therefore, for many conditions, if  then pore diffusion limitations can be excluded.

References 

Scientific techniques
Laboratory techniques
Transport phenomena
Chemical reaction engineering